UFC 241: Cormier vs. Miocic 2 was a mixed martial arts event produced by the Ultimate Fighting Championship that took place on August 17, 2019 at the Honda Center in Anaheim, California.

Background
A UFC Heavyweight Championship rematch between current champion Daniel Cormier and former champion Stipe Miocic served as the event's headliner. The pairing met previously at UFC 226 on July 7, 2018 when then UFC Light Heavyweight Champion Cormier knocked out Miocic in the first round to capture the heavyweight title.

A middleweight bout between former interim UFC Middleweight Championship challenger (as well as 2000 Olympic silver medalist and former world champion in freestyle wrestling) Yoel Romero and Paulo Costa was rescheduled for this event. The pairing was previously scheduled to take place at UFC 230, at UFC Fight Night: Cejudo vs. Dillashaw and again at UFC Fight Night: Jacaré vs. Hermansson but was scrapped each time for various reasons.

A lightweight bout was scheduled between John Makdessi and Devonte Smith for the event. However, it was reported on July 30 that Makdessi was forced to withdraw for undisclosed reasons. Returning veteran Clay Collard was briefly linked as the replacement. In turn, Collard was removed from the bout during the week leading up to the event due to an undisclosed medical issue. Smith instead fought promotional newcomer Khama Worthy.

A flyweight bout was scheduled between Maryna Moroz and Poliana Botelho for the event. However, it was reported on August 1 that Moroz was forced to pull from the event citing injury. In early August, Botelho announced via social media that she was no longer participating in the event.

Manny Bermudez and Casey Kenney were originally scheduled to fight at bantamweight. However, the UFC decided to move the bout to a catchweight bout of 140 lb due to Bermudez not being able to safely cut weight the night before weigh-ins. According to Kenney, he received a part of Bermudez's purse despite him not technically missing weight.

Results

Bonus awards
The following fighters received $50,000 bonuses.
Fight of the Night: Paulo Costa vs. Yoel Romero
Performance of the Night: Stipe Miocic and Khama Worthy

Reported payout
The following is the reported payout to the fighters as reported to the California State Athletic Commission. It does not include sponsor money and also does not include the UFC's traditional "fight night" bonuses. The total disclosed payout for the event was $3,318,000.
 Stipe Miocic: $750,000 (no win bonus) def. Daniel Cormier: $500,000
 Nate Diaz: $250,000 (no win bonus) def. Anthony Pettis: $155,000
 Paulo Costa: $120,000 (includes $60,000 win bonus) def. Yoel Romero: $150,000
 Sodiq Yusuff: $28,000 (includes $14,000 win bonus) def. Gabriel Benítez: $40,000
 Derek Brunson: $190,000 (includes $95,000 win bonus) def. Ian Heinisch: $25,000
 Khama Worthy: $24,000 (includes $12,000 win bonus) def. Devonte Smith: $23,000 
 Cory Sandhagen: $154,000 (includes $77,000 win bonus) def. Raphael Assunção: $79,000
 Drakkar Klose: $56,000 (includes $28,000 win bonus) def. Christos Giagos: $28,000 
 Casey Kenney: $28,000 (includes $14,000 win bonus) def. Manny Bermudez: $20,000
 Hannah Cifers: $28,000 (includes $14,000 win bonus) def. Jodie Esquibel: $10,000
 Kyung Ho Kang: $44,000 (includes $22,000 win bonus) def. Brandon Davis: $21,000
 Sabina Mazo: $20,000 (includes $10,000 win bonus) def. Shana Dobson: $12,000

See also 

 List of UFC events
 2019 in UFC
 List of current UFC fighters

References 

Ultimate Fighting Championship events
Events in Anaheim, California
2019 in mixed martial arts
Mixed martial arts in California
Sports competitions in Anaheim, California
2019 in sports in California
August 2019 sports events in the United States